FC Pune City (FCPC) is an Indian professional football club based in the city of Pune, Maharashtra, which plays in the Indian Super League. The club was formed in 2014 with a philosophy to provide stimulus to the growth and development of football in the state of Maharashtra and to participate in the inaugural season of the Indian Super League. The team is owned by Rajesh Wadhawan Group, its promoters Mr. Kapil Wadhawan and Mr. Dheeraj Wadhawan and actor Arjun Kapoor.

The philosophy behind the inception of the club was to promote and develop the game of football in the city of Pune right from the grassroots levels onwards. FC Pune City aims to be the club which players passionately aspire to be a part of and a club to whom fans pledge their loyalties.
 
In 2016, FC Pune City became the only professional football club in India to have teams which participated at all levels of professional football; Senior Team (ISL), U-18 Team (I-League U-18), U- 16 Team, U-14 Team and the Women’s Team.

Team records

Seasons

Head coach's record

Player records
 Youngest player to play- Fanai Lalrempuia (19 years and 148 years old, debut against Northeast United on 9 October 2015)
 Oldest player- Robertino Pugliara (33 years and 323 years old, debut against Chennaiyin FC on 13 January 2018)
 Top goalscorer- Emiliano Alfaro (19 goals, 0.47 per match)

References

FC Pune City related lists
Indian football club statistics